The list of sovereign debt crises involves the inability of independent countries to meet its liabilities as they become due. These include:

A sovereign default, where a government suspends debt repayments
A debt restructuring plan, where the government agrees with other countries, or unilaterally reduces its debt repayments
Requiring assistance from the International Monetary Fund or another international source

Debts could be owed either to private parties within a country, to foreign investors, or to other countries.

The following table includes actual sovereign defaults and debt restructuring of independent countries since 1557.

Africa

Asia

Europe

North America

South America

Oceania

See also

List of corporate collapses and scandals
List of stock market crashes and bear markets
List of largest U.S. bank failures
Currency crisis
Government debt
War reparations
Global settlement
London Club
Paris Club

References

Further reading

Insolvency
Government debt by country